Hellinsia basuto is a moth of the family Pterophoridae. It is found in Lesotho.

References

basuto
Moths of Africa
Fauna of Lesotho
Moths described in 2011